Schnitt may refer to:
Adolf Schnitt (1858–1924), Finnish sports shooter
Corinna Schnitt (born 1964), German filmmaker and artist
Todd Schnitt (born 1966), American talk radio host
Schnitt, a German language film magazine